Sander Post (born 10 September 1984 in Viljandi) is an Estonian football coach and former player who played as a centre back.

Club career

Early career
Post made his first-team debut for FC Elva at the age of 16 in 2001, as a defender. After two seasons in Elva, he moved to JK Viljandi Tulevik. At the age of 19, Sander started his professional career with FC Flora Tallinn, Estonia's biggest club, in 2004. In the same season he had short spell with JK Tervis Pärnu, where he made 19 appearances, scoring 8 goals.

Stint in Denmark
On 16 June 2005, Post signed for Danish 1st Division club Vejle Boldklub on a one-year loan deal, but failed to make impact there and only played in one league match.

Back to Flora
In summer 2006, Post returned to Flora. Until 2008 had he played mostly as a centre back, but was moved to play as a striker, because the team lacked attacking players due to injury crysis. The tall Estonian accommodated his new role well, scoring 19 goals in 20 games, before moving abroad again.

Go Ahead Eagles
On 21 August 2008, Post signed for Dutch side Go Ahead Eagles on a one-year loan deal for initial fee of €60,000 with a buy clause of €200,000. Only one day later he scored his first goal for Go Ahead Eagles in his debut match in Eerste Divisie and for Go Ahead Eagles, in the 72nd minute in a 1–1 draw against RKC Waalwijk. The loan deal was extended for another season in summer 2009.

Back to FC Flora
In 2010, Post arrived back to Flora in the middle of the season. He scored 24 goals with 17 games in 2010 Meistriliiga and became the world's most effective Top Division Goal Scorer with 1,412 goals per game.

He started his 2011 Meistriliiga season well with a goal against JK Nõmme Kalju.

Aalesunds FK
On 31 March 2011, Post signed a three-year contract with Norwegian club Aalesunds FK. AaFK was looking for a replacement for their striker Tor Hogne Aarøy (204 cm) who had left the club for a career in Japan. He made his debut for Aalesund on 1 April 2011, in a 2–0 loss versus Vålerenga Fotball, the day after he had signed. On 16 May 2011 he scored his first league goal for Aalesund, in a 2–1 win versus Strømsgodset IF. The contract was mutually terminated on 1 February 2013 due to lack of play time.

Flora again
Post rejoined FC Flora Tallinn on 11 February 2013, when he signed a contract until the end of the 2014 season with the club. He made his return in an Estonian Cup match against FC Reaal, in which he scored 8 goals in an 18-0 win for Flora.

International career
He made his national team debut on 2 December 2004 against Hungary in a 2004 King's Cup. More than five years later, on 21 May 2010, he made the second appearance for the team in a friendly match against Finland, in which he scored his first international goal.

International goals

Career stats

Club

Honours
 Meistriliiga Footballer of the Season 2010

References

External links
 
 Go Ahead Eagles profile
 
 

1984 births
Living people
Sportspeople from Viljandi
Estonian footballers
Association football forwards
Association football defenders
Estonia international footballers
Viljandi JK Tulevik players
FC Flora players
Vejle Boldklub players
FC Elva players
Go Ahead Eagles players
Aalesunds FK players
Meistriliiga players
Eerste Divisie players
Danish 1st Division players
Eliteserien players
Estonian expatriate footballers
Expatriate footballers in the Netherlands
Estonian expatriate sportspeople in the Netherlands
Expatriate men's footballers in Denmark
Estonian expatriate sportspeople in Denmark
Expatriate footballers in Norway
Estonian expatriate sportspeople in Norway
Estonian football managers